Absolute OTO Award

Currently held by  Adela Banášová

First awarded  | Last awarded 2000 | Present 

Absolute OTO Award has been annually presented at the Slovak OTO Awards.

Winners

2000s

2010s

 Notes
┼ Denotes also a winner in two or more of the main categories. Ž Denotes also a winner of the Život Award.

Superlatives

Multiple winners

References

External links
 OTO Awards (Official website)
 OTO Awards - Winners and nominees (From 2000 onwards)
 OTO Awards - Winners and nominees (From 2000 to 2009)

OTO Awards
Slovak culture
Slovak television awards
Awards established in 2000